The Utah State Aggies are a Division I men's college basketball team that plays in the Mountain West Conference, representing Utah State University. In the 17 years that former coach Stew Morrill was at the helm, Utah State had the 4th highest winning percentage in the nation at home, behind only Duke, Kansas, and Gonzaga. As of the end of the 2018–19 season, the Aggies have an all-time record of 1,604 wins and 1,119 losses (.589 win pct).

History
The first basketball team on Utah State's campus was organized in 1902 and consisted of only women. A men's team was organized in 1904, at which point the women's club fell into obscurity.

The Aggies enjoyed mixed success early in their history, notching sporadic NCAA tournament appearances and alternating winning in the then-smaller postseason bracket with not winning much at all. Perhaps the most notable event in Utah State basketball history occurred on February 8, 1965, with the tragic death of Wayne Estes. Estes was a 6'6" forward for the Aggies, and was the nation's second leading scorer in 1965, behind only Rick Barry, at 33.7 ppg. He had just amassed 2,000 career points with a 48-point showing in a home victory over the University of Denver, when he stopped at the scene of a car accident in Logan. While crossing the street, Estes accidentally clipped a downed power line with his head and was electrocuted. The Los Angeles Lakers had planned on drafting him in the 1st round of the NBA draft, where he likely would have gone on to win several championships with the team. Following Estes's death, he was posthumously awarded 1st team All-American honors.

The men's basketball team wasn't adversely affected by the constant shuffling of conference affiliations and independent status that blighted the USU football program throughout the mid-to-late 20th century. The program, however, did endure a lengthy stint as an independent program, from 1937 to 1978—although in that period, basketball independence was not the financial and competitive obstacle that it would become in the ESPN era. All the while, it remained the most resilient and popular sport at USU, enjoying steady success for decades. During the 1960s and '70s, the Aggies spent a great deal of time in both major national polls, finishing the season in the AP Top 25 three times and in the Coaches' Poll Top 25 seven times during those two decades. USU reached the NCAA Sweet 16 in 1962, and the Elite 8 in 1970.

The Aggies enjoy a particularly strong home-court advantage at the Dee Glen Smith Spectrum, where they were 193–13 in the Morrill era.

During the 2008–09 season, USU led the nation in field goal percentage with 49.8%. In addition, they were 2nd in win/loss percentage and 5th in assist-to-turnover ratio. In 2009–10, the Aggies led the nation in 3-point percentage with an incredible 42.5%. The Aggies have spent time in the national rankings, reaching as high as #19 in the Coaches' Poll in 2003–04, and #17 in 2008–09. During the 2009–2010, the Aggies reached as high as #26, one spot out of the actual rankings, before falling back to #31 for the postseason poll. The Aggies finished the season in 2011 ranked #19 in the AP poll.  In 2019, although not ranked in the preseason poll, the Aggies finished the season again ranked in the AP poll, coming in at #25. 2020, saw the Aggies ranked #17 in the preseason poll.

Utah State has also won the Old Oquirrh Bucket nine times, including both of the last two seasons. The Bucket is the award given each year to the best college basketball team in Utah, based on records against in-state opponents.

Post season history

NCAA tournament
Utah State is 6–24 (.207) in its NCAA tournament history. In recent years, the team has won invitations to the tournament in 1998 (under coach Larry Eustachy), 2000, 2001, 2003, 2005, 2006, 2009 and 2010 (all under Morrill).  From 1978 to 2005, Utah State was a member of the Big West Conference.  In both 2006 and 2010, the Aggies received at-large bids to the tournament after losing in the WAC tournament championship game. Despite a stellar season in 2003–04 and a national top-25 ranking toward the end of the season, the Aggies did not receive an at-large tournament bid after being upset in the conference tournament, making them the last top-25 team in college basketball to be snubbed from the tournament.  This decision earned the derision of coach Morrill, as the Aggies held a 25–3 record along with their ranking.

In 2009, USU won the WAC tournament championship game, defeating Nevada in Reno. The team went on to lose in the first round of the NCAA tournament to Marquette, 58–57. The most recent NCAA tournament success was a first-round upset over fifth-seeded Ohio State University in 2001.

The 2010 team received an at-large bid from the selection committee after losing in the WAC tournament final to New Mexico State. The 12th-seeded Aggies then lost their opening round game to Texas A&M.

The Aggies would have appeared in the 2020 NCAA tournament after being champions of the 2020 Mountain West tournament, however, the NCAA tournament was cancelled amid the 2020 coronavirus outbreak.

NIT
The Aggies have appeared in 10 National Invitation Tournaments, with a combined record of 2–10.

CIT
The Aggies have appeared in one CollegeInsider.com Tournament. Their record is 4–1.

Home-court advantage
Utah State plays its home games at the Dee Glen Smith Spectrum, a 10,270-seat arena on the Utah State campus. The Aggies are 453–105 (.812) at the Smith Spectrum, which has housed basketball since 1970. Previous to the building of the Spectrum, Utah State's basketball teams played at the George Nelson Fieldhouse on campus. Under head coach Craig Smith, USU is 39–4 (.910) at home. Until a surprising early-season loss in 2009, USU boasted the second-longest home win streak in the nation, behind Kansas.

The Smith Spectrum features seats at court level, extremely-close to the players. The university also reserves an unusually-high percentage of seats, including at court level, for its students. This has aided the USU student section in becoming one of the most notoriously loud and raucous (and clever) in the nation, with major publicity in recent years. Various sources have called the Smith Spectrum among the hardest places in the nation for opposing teams to play.  In the '90s, when his teams were reaching the Final Four and competing at the highest echelons of college basketball, University of Utah coach Rick Majerus called the Smith Spectrum the toughest place in the country for his teams to play. After a February 2010 game at the Smith Spectrum, Wichita State head coach Gregg Marshall said "Utah State has 4000 student tickets and they make some type of impression on the visiting team and it's just a party. It is one heck of a party. It's the best I've ever seen. In many, many years I've been at Duke and Kentucky and UConn and Syracuse and it's clearly the best I've ever seen in terms of atmosphere."

An unofficial newsletter entitled "The Refraction" was published before each game day until it was discontinued in 2011.  One student fan, known as "Wild Bill", has also gained much renown as of late for his unique techniques to distract opposing free throw shooters. Other Utah State traditions are their "I believe that we will win!" chant and "Winning team, losing team" chant that mocks the away losing team in the last seconds of a game.

Retired jerseys
The following players have their jerseys retired, but numbers are still active.

Awards

Consensus Second Team All-Americans
Wayne Estes - 1965

Third Team All-Americans
Cornell Green - 1962
Wayne Estes - 1964

AP Honorable Mention All-Americans
Shaler Halimon - 1968
Marv Roberts - 1969, 1971
Greg Grant - 1983, 1985, 1986
Jaycee Carroll - 2007, 2008
Gary Wilkinson - 2009
Tai Wesley - 2011
Sam Merrill - 2019
Neemias Queta - 2021

Perry Wallace Most Courageous Award (USBWA)
 Connor Odom – 2023

Conference Player of the Year
Dean Hunger - 1980
Greg Grant - 1986
Eric Franson - 1995
Jaycee Carroll - 2008
Gary Wilkinson - 2009
Tai Wesley - 2011
Sam Merrill - 2019

First Team All-Conference
Dean Hunger - 1979, 1980
Brian Jackson - 1981
Greg Grant - 1985, 1986
Kevin Nixon - 1988
Reid Newey - 1989
Kendall Youngblood - 1992
Eric Franson - 1995, 1996
Marcus Saxon - 1997, 1998
Troy Rolle - 2000
Shawn Daniels - 2000, 2001
Bernard Rock - 2001
Tony Brown - 2002
Desmond Penigar - 2002, 2003
Cardell Butler - 2004
Mark Brown - 2004
Spencer Nelson - 2005
Nate Harris - 2004, 2005, 2006
Jaycee Carroll - 2007, 2008
Gary Wilkinson - 2009
Jared Quayle - 2010
Tai Wesley - 2010, 2011
Brockeith Pane - 2011
Preston Medlin - 2012
Sam Merrill - 2019, 2020
Neemias Queta - 2021
Steven Ashworth - 2023

Season-by-season results

Footnotes

References

External links
 

 
1903 establishments in Utah